Clean Slate may refer to:

Clean Slate (1994 film), a film released by MGM in 1994 starring Dana Carvey and Valeria Golino
"Clean Slate" (Kim Possible), Kim Possible episode
Clean Slate Program, Stanford University research program which considers "Clean Slate" internet redesign
Coup de Torchon (Clean Slate), a French film released in 1981

See also
Criminal Records (Clean Slate) Act 2004, an Act of Parliament in New Zealand
Blank slate, a philosophical theory of the mind